Alvin Martin Slaughter (born July 17, 1955) is an American gospel musician, worship leader, and singer-songwriter.

Slaughter is based out of New York City, where he was a member of the Brooklyn Tabernacle Choir until the early 1990s, when he was signed by Integrity Music and began his solo career. He has been nominated for several Dove Awards and performed on the TBN television network. He is married to Joy Slaughter, where they together reside in New York.

Slaughter is no longer signed to Integrity Music and hasn't released any official music since 2008.  Alvin continues to travel and perform Christian Concerts with his wife sharing from her experiences as a former Missionary to Haiti, and life experiences.  He can be contacted and booked at www.AlvinSlaughter.com

Discography
Revive Us Again (Hosanna! Music, 1994) U.S. Contemporary Christian No. 34
God Can (Hosanna Music, 1996) U.S. Contemporary Christian No. 22
Yes (Integrity Music, 1997) U.S. Contemporary Christian No. 38
Rain Down! (Hosanna Music, 2000) U.S. Contemporary Christian No. 27
On the Inside (Epic Records, 2003) U.S. Gospel No. 23
The Faith Life (Epic, 2005) U.S. Gospel No. 41
Overcomer (Columbia Records, 2008)

References

External links
Official website
Artist's label page

1955 births
American gospel singers
Living people
Songwriters from New York (state)
Singers from New York City
African-American male songwriters
21st-century African-American male singers
20th-century African-American male singers